Huttig School District #60 was a school district headquartered in Huttig, Arkansas.

It operated Huttig Elementary School and Huttig High School. Circa 2004 it had 240 students.

By 2004 new laws were passed requiring school districts with enrollments below 350 to consolidate with other school districts. Huttig was one of several districts that were unable to find another district willing to consolidate with it, so the Arkansas Board of Education was to forcibly consolidate it. On July 1, 2004, it consolidated with the Strong School District to form the Strong-Huttig School District.

References

Further reading
 These maps include predecessor districts
 Map of Arkansas School Districts pre-July 1, 2004
 (Download)

External links
 

Defunct school districts in Arkansas
School districts disestablished in 2004
2004 disestablishments in Arkansas
Education in Union County, Arkansas